The St. Marys River (Shawnee: Kokothikithiipi, in Miami-Illinois: Nameewa siipiiwi) is a  tributary of the Maumee River (Miami-Illinois: Taawaawa siipiiwi) in northwestern Ohio and northeastern Indiana in the United States. Prior to development, it was part of the Great Black Swamp.  Today, it drains a primarily rural farming region in the watershed of Lake Erie.

It is formed in southern Auglaize County in western Ohio by the confluence of the short East Branch and Center Branch. It flows briefly west to St. Marys, approaching to within two miles of Grand Lake before turning to the north. In northwestern Auglaize County it turns sharply to the west-northwest, flowing past Rockford and Willshire into Adams County, Indiana. In northeastern Indiana it flows northwest through Decatur, then enters Fort Wayne. It hooks around in its last half mile (0.8 km) to join the St. Joseph River (in Miami-Illinois: Kociihsasiipi) from the west to form the Maumee in downtown Fort Wayne.

The World War II-era US Navy vessel St. Mary's River was named after this river.

See also
 List of Indiana rivers
 List of rivers of Ohio

References

External links

Rivers of Indiana
Rivers of Ohio
Rivers of Auglaize County, Ohio
Bodies of water of Adams County, Indiana
Rivers of Van Wert County, Ohio
Rivers of Mercer County, Ohio
Tributaries of Lake Erie
Rivers of Allen County, Indiana